is a Japanese professional wrestler currently working for the Japanese promotions World Wonder Ring Stardom.

Professional wrestling career

Independent circuit (2019-present)
Maika made her professional wrestling debut at TAKA & Taichi Produce TAKATaichiMania II, an event produced by Taka Michinoku and Taichi in the Japanese independent scene on May 7, 2019 where she picked up a victory over Mima Shimoda.

World Wonder Ring Stardom (2020-present)
Maika joined the World Wonder Ring Stardom promotion after unsuccessfully challenging Utami Hayashishita for the Future of Stardom Championship at  JTO Hatsu, a Professional Wrestling Just Tap Out's show from January 14, 2020. Giulia was the one who recruited her into the newborn stable Donna Del Mondo. At Stardom 10th Anniversary from January 17, 2021, she unsuccessfully challenged Utami Hayashishita for the World of Stardom Championship. On the tenth night of Stardom New Year Stars 2021 from February 20, she competed in a 20-woman battle royal also involving Mayu Iwatani, Bea Priestley, Tam Nakano, Unagi Sayaka and others.

She is known for competing in various of the promotion's signature events. At 10th Anniversary of Stardom from March 3, 2021, she teamed up with Himeka to successfully defend the Goddess of Stardom Championship against Oedo Tai (Natsuko Tora and Saki Kashima). At Stardom Yokohama Dream Cinderella 2021 on April 4, she and Himeka dropped the titles to fellow Donna Del Mondo stablemates Giulia and Syuri. at the Stardom Cinderella Tournament 2021, Maika defeated Konami in the first rounds from April 10, Giulia in the second round from May 14, but fell short to Saya Kamitani in the finals from June 12. At Yokohama Dream Cinderella 2021 in Summer on July 4 she competed in a Gauntlet tag team match by teaming up with Lady C, unsuccessfully challenging Oedo Tai (Konami and Fukigen Death), Hanan and Hina, and Oedo Tai (Saki Kashima and Rina). She was also part of the Stardom 5 Star Grand Prix 2021 where she competed in the Block B. At Stardom 10th Anniversary Grand Final Osaka Dream Cinderella on October 9, 2021, Maika teamed up with Himeka and Natsupoi to defend the Artist of Stardom Championship against Queen's Quest (Momo Watanabe, AZM and Saya Kamitani). At the 2021 edition of the Goddesses of Stardom Tag League, Maika teamed up with Syuri as "Ponytail and Samurai Road" and fought in the "Blue Goddess" Block where they scored a total of 6 points after going against the teams of MOMOAZ (AZM and Momo Watanabe), BlueMarine (Mayu Iwatani and Rin Kadokura), Kurotora Kaidou (Starlight Kid and Ruaka), Dream H (Tam Nakano and Mina Shirakawa) and C Moon (Lady C and Waka Tsukiyama). Maika competed at Stardom Super Wars, a trilogy of events which started on November 3, 2021 with the Kawasaki Super Wars show where she fell short against Mina Shirakawa and Saya Kamitani in a three-way match. At Tokyo Super Wars on November 27, she unsuccessfully challenged Utami Hayashishita for the World of Stardom Championship, and at Osaka Super Wars on December 18, she teamed up with her "MaiHimePoi" trio partners Himeka and Natsupoi and won a ¥10 Million Unit Tournament by defeating Marvelous (Takumi Iroha, Rin Kadokura and Maria) in the semi-finals and Stars (Mayu Iwatani, Hazuki and Koguma) in the finals as a result of a Six-woman tag team ladder match. Both of their matches were also for the Artist of Stardom titles which they defended successfully two times in a single night. At Stardom Dream Queendom on December 29, 2021, Maika teamed up again with Himeka and Natsupoi to successfully defend the Artist of Stardom titles against Cosmic Angels (Mina Shirakawa, Unagi Sayaka and Mai Sakurai).

At Stardom Nagoya Supreme Fight on January 29, 2022, Maika teamed up with Himeka and unsuccessfully challenged FWC (Hazuki and Koguma) for the Goddess of Stardom Championship. At Stardom Cinderella Journey on February 23, 2022, she teamed up with Syuri and Himeka and went into a time-limit draw against stablemates Giulia, Thekla and Mirai. On the firs night of the Stardom World Climax 2022 from March 26, Maika teamed up with Thekla in a losing effort against Prominence (Risa Sera and Suzu Suzuki). On the second night from March 27, she teamed up with Himeka, Giulia and Thekla to defeat Sera, Suzuki, Akane Fujita and Mochi Miyagi. In the Stardom Cinderella Tournament 2022, Maika made it to the second rounds where she and Saya Kamitani simultaneiusly eliminated each other from the competition over the top rope. At Stardom Golden Week Fight Tour on May 5, 2022, she unsuccessfully challenged Saya Kamitani for the Wonder of Stardom Championship. At Stardom Flashing Champions on May 28, 2022, Maika alongside Natsupoi and Himeka dropped the Artist of Stardom Championship to Starlight Kid, Momo Watanabe and Saki Kashima. At Stardom Fight in the Top on June 26, 2022, Maika teamed up with Giulia and Mai Sakurai to challenge again for the artist titles, this time in a three-way match also involving God's Eye (Syuri, Ami Sourei and Mirai). At Mid Summer Champions in Tokyo, the first night of the Stardom Mid Summer Champions series which took place on July 9, 2022, Maika teamed up with Gulia, Himeka, Natsupoi and Mai Sakurai to face Cosmic Angels (Tam Nakano, Unagi Sayaka, Mina Shirakawa, Saki and Hikari Shimizu). Donna Del Mondo lost the match after Natsupoi defected to Cosmic Angels. At Mid Summer Champions in Nagoya on July 24, 2022, Maika teamed up with Giulia and Himeka and unsuccessfully challenged Starlight Kid, Momo Watanabe and Saki Kashima for the Artist of Stardom Championship. At Stardom in Showcase vol.1 on July 23, 2022, Maika teamed up with Himeka and defeated Saya Iida and Ami Sourei. In the Stardom 5 Star Grand Prix 2022, Maika fought in the "Red Stars" Blok where she scored a total of 15 points after competing against Tam Nakano, Risa Sera, AZM, Utami Hayashishita, Koguma, Syuri, Saki Kashima, Saki, Mai Sakurai, Momo Kohgo and Unagi Sayaka. At Stardom x Stardom: Nagoya Midsummer Encounter on August 21, 2022, Maika defeated Hina. At Stardom in Showcase vol.2 on September 25, 2022, Maika unsuccessfully challenged AZM, Ram Kaicho and Mayu Iwatani in a four-way match. At Hiroshima Goddess Festival om November 3, 2022, Maika unsuccessfully challenged Syuri for the World of Stardom Championship.

New Japan Pro Wrestling (2021)

Maika was part of the series of exhibition matches to promote female talent hosted by New Japan Pro Wrestling. On the second night of the Wrestle Kingdom 15, she teamed up with fellow stablemates Himeka and Natsupoi in a losing effort to Queen's Quest (AZM, Saya Kamitani, and Utami Hayashishita) as a result of a Six-woman tag team match. On the first night of the Wrestle Grand Slam in MetLife Dome from September 4 where she teamed up with Lady C in a losing effort to Queen's Quest (Saya Kamitani and Momo Watanabe).

Championships and accomplishments
 World Wonder Ring Stardom
 Future of Stardom Championship (1 time)
 Artist of Stardom Championship (2 times) – with Giulia and Syuri (1) Himeka and Natsupoi (1)
Goddess of Stardom Championship (1 time) – with Himeka
 5★Star GP Award (2 times)
5★Star GP Fighting Spirit (2020)
 5★Star GP Best Match Award (2022) –

References 

Living people
Japanese female professional wrestlers
People from Fukuoka Prefecture
Sportspeople from Fukuoka Prefecture
Year of birth missing (living people)
21st-century professional wrestlers
Goddess of Stardom Champions
Artist of Stardom Champions
Future of Stardom Champions